The  was an infantry division of the Imperial Japanese Army. The division was formed 15 June 1944 in Luzon. The nucleus of the formation was the 32nd Independent Mixed Brigade. The 103rd division was a Type C (hei) security division therefore the division backbone has comprised independent infantry battalions instead of infantry regiments.

Action
Initially 103rd division was tasked with the garrisoning of north Luzon, with 79th infantry brigade covering north-west and 80th infantry brigade covering north-east quarter of the island.

During the Battle of Luzon since 9 January 1945, the 103rd division zone of responsibility was from Aparri to west. Soon the 103rd division has retreated to the mountains inland and largely survived around Magat River until surrender of Japan 15 August 1945.

See also
 List of Japanese Infantry Divisions
 Independent Mixed Brigades (Imperial Japanese Army)

Notes and references
This article incorporates material from Japanese Wikipedia page 第103師団 (日本軍), accessed 26 June 2016
 Madej, W. Victor. Japanese Armed Forces Order of Battle, 1937–1945 [2 vols] Allentown, PA: 1981

Japanese World War II divisions
Infantry divisions of Japan
Military units and formations established in 1944
Military units and formations disestablished in 1945
1944 establishments in Japan
1945 disestablishments in Japan